Caka may refer last names in Kosovo and Albania to:
Caka, Cakaj, Çaka, or Çakaj  

 Čaka, a village in Levice District, Slovakia
 Caka language, a Tivoid language of Cameroon
 Tzachas (d. 1093), Turkish naval commander
 Masar Caka (1946–2000), Albanian painter
 Marko Caka (b. 1971), Albanian American actor